Events in the year 1613 in Norway.

Incumbents
Monarch: Christian IV

Events
20 January - The Kalmar War ends.
2 August - The Gjerpen Trial begins.
21 August - The Gjerpen Trial ends. Several priests and two students were found guilty of secretly support Catholicism. They were convicted to loss of benefice and inheritance, and were instructed to leave the country. One of the convicted was Christoffer Hjort.

Arts and literature

Births

Deaths

See also

References